The Northern Storm Water Interceptor (NSWI), is a large stormwater tunnel that acts as a flood prevention measure for Bristol, England.

Building of the storm drain started in 1951 to relieve flooding over many parts of Bristol, and was completed in 1962. There are however over 7 miles of tunnels in total. Originally proposed by the County Surveyors Frederick Ashmead and Col T H Yabbicom in the 1890s, due to the Great War, the Depression and the Second World War, construction was postponed until 1951. The scheme was reborn after the floods in Bristol 1947. The Tunnel was designed by Bristol City Engineers including Peter Steele and Bernard Smission from 1947. It was constructed by A.E.Farr Limited.

Smission invented the Energy Dissipating Vortex Drop Pipe System of which two were constructed along the tunnel. The technology has since been used in Chicago, New York and closer to home in Plymouth.

There is a plaque commemorating the building of the tunnel just across the Portway road from the outfall.  This says:

This is the outfall of the Northern Stormwater Interceptor constructed to relieve flooding in the central North and East of Bristol.  Started in 1951 the project consists of 7 1/2 miles of tunnel. 

The main tunnel is 16 feet in diameter and over 3 miles long, begins at the flood water intake on the River Frome at Eastville and discharges into the River Avon at this point.

The works were inaugurated by Dr. the Rt. Hon. Charles Hill, M.P. Minister of Housing and Local Government on the 4th April 1962 

The future management of flooding risk in the Eastville area is under consideration.

References

External links
 Nettleden – The Motherload, Bristol
 Map

Buildings and structures in Bristol
Tunnels completed in 1962
Tunnels in Bristol